Joseph D. Kelly was an American sound engineer. He was nominated for an Academy Award for the film What Ever Happened to Baby Jane? in the category Sound Recording.

Selected filmography
 What Ever Happened to Baby Jane? (1962)

References

External links
 

Year of birth missing
American audio engineers
Possibly living people